Davalos or Dávalos is a Spanish surname. Notable people with the surname include:

Alexa Davalos (born 1982), American actress
Armando Hart Dávalos (born 1930), Cuban politician and Communist leader
David Davalos (born 1965), American playwright
Doug Davalos (born 1970), men's basketball coach at Texas State University
Elyssa Davalos (born 1959), American television and film actress
Pelagio Antonio de Labastida y Dávalos (1816 — 1891), Mexican Roman Catholic prelate, lawyer, doctor of canon law and politician
Richard Davalos (born 1930), American actor
Rudy Davalos, American basketball coach and college athletics director
Ruy López Dávalos (1357 — 1428), Count of Ribadeo

See also
d'Avalos